Golden Heart is the debut solo studio album by British singer-songwriter and guitarist Mark Knopfler, released on 26 March 1996 by Vertigo Records internationally and Warner Bros. Records in the United States. Following a successful career leading British rock band Dire Straits and composing a string of critically acclaimed film soundtrack albums, Knopfler recorded his first solo album, drawing upon the various musical influences he'd engaged since emerging as a major recording artist in 1978. The album reached the top-10 position on charts in Austria, Belgium, Finland, Italy, the Netherlands, Norway, Sweden, Switzerland and the United Kingdom. The album peaked at 105 on the Billboard 200 in the United States.

Background 
Following the release of Dire Straits' final studio album, On Every Street, and a grueling 15-month world tour of Europe, North America and Australia—a tour seen by 7.1 million people that ended in October 1992—Knopfler quietly dissolved the popular British rock band that had become one of the world's most commercially successful bands, with worldwide album sales of more than 120 million. He would later recall, "I put the thing to bed because I wanted to get back to some kind of reality. It's self-protection, a survival thing. That kind of scale is dehumanizing." He spent two years recovering from the experience, which had taken a toll on his creative and personal lives. In 1994, he began work on what would become his first solo album.

Singles

"Darling Pretty" 

"Darling Pretty" is the first single from the album. It reached number 33 in the UK Singles Chart, and was featured in the 1996 film Twister. "Gravy Train", the second track on the maxi-single, was featured in the 2001 film America's Sweethearts.

Track listing

"Cannibals" 

"Cannibals" is the second single from the album. It is very similar in sound and structure to the Dire Straits hit single "Walk of Life", also written by Knopfler. "Cannibals" is taken from the album. "Tall Order Baby" and "What Have I Got to Do" are outtakes from the album. The song was the concert opener for the Kill to Get Crimson Tour in 2008.

Track listing

"Rüdiger" 

"Rüdiger" is the third and final single from the album. "Rüdiger" is taken from the album. Rudiger was used on the soundtrack for the film The Bandits. "My Claim to Fame", "Tall Order Baby", and "What Have I Got to Do" are outtakes from the album.

Track listing

Touring 

Knopfler supported the release of Golden Heart with the Golden Heart Tour of Europe, which started on 24 April 1996 in Galway, Ireland, and included 84 concerts in 66 cities, ending in Antibes, France, on 4 August 1996. The tour lineup included Mark Knopfler (guitar, vocals), Guy Fletcher (keyboards), Richard Bennett (guitar), Glenn Worf (bass), Chad Cromwell (drums) and Jim Cox (keyboards). This initial touring group later became known to Knopfler fans as the 96-ers. A preview performance with an expanded lineup of players was given on 15 April 1996 at the BBC Building in London. This show was recorded and later released on video as A Night in London.

Critical reception 

In his review for AllMusic, William Ruhlmann gave the album three out of five stars, finding that despite Knopfler's trademark guitar work and sardonic lyrics, there was "little on the album that was new or striking, and Knopfler seemed to fall back on familiar guitar techniques while intoning often obscure lyrics. Ruhlmann set aside any reference to the musical effect of Knopfler's eclectic and newly introduced acoustic bass, string arrangements or traditional Irish accompaniments and concluded:

Track listing

Personnel 
Music
 Mark Knopfler – guitar, vocals
 Richard Bennett – acoustic guitar (1, 2, 3, 8, 9, 11, 12), guitar (5, 6) tiplé (10)
 Sonny Landreth – National steel guitar (10), backing vocals (10)
 Don Potter – acoustic guitar (14)
 Paul Franklin – pedal steel guitar (1, 9, 11, 12, 14)
 Derek Bell – Irish harp (1)
 Paul Brady – whistle (1, 7, 13)
 Seán Keane – violin (1, 7, 13)
 Dónal Lunny – bouzouki (1, 7, 13)
 Máirtín O'Connor – accordion (1, 7, 13)
 Liam O'Flynn – uilleann pipes (7, 13)
 Steve Conn – accordion (10)
 Jo-El Sonnier – accordion (8)
 Michael Doucet – fiddle (10)
 Matt Rollings – piano (1, 5, 11)
 Barry Beckett – piano (9, 12)
 Hargus "Pig" Robbins – piano (14)
 Bill Cuomo – Hammond organ (6)
 Guy Fletcher – keyboards (3, 4, 8, 12), backing vocals (1, 2, 3, 4, 6, 8)
 Steve Nathan – Hammond organ (1, 2, 8, 9, 12, 14), keyboards (3, 5, 9, 11, 14)
 Paul Moore – bass guitar (13), string bass (7)
 Michael Rhodes – bass guitar (1, 5, 9, 10, 11, 12, 14)
 Glenn Worf – bass guitar (2, 3, 6), string bass (4, 8)
 Eddie Bayers – drums (1, 5, 9, 10, 11, 12, 14)
 Robbie Casserly – drums (13)
 Chad Cromwell – drums (2, 3, 4, 6, 8)
 Danny Cummings – backing vocals (1, 3, 4, 6, 8, 10, 11), percussion (2, 4, 5, 11, 12, 14)
 Terry McMillan – djembe (5)
 Billy Ware – triangle (10)
 Brendan Croker – backing vocals (4, 8)
 Vince Gill – backing vocals (12, 14)

Production
 Mark Knopfler – producer
 Chuck Ainlay – producer, engineer, mixing
 Brian Masterson – engineer
 Graham Lewis – assistant engineer, mixing assistant
 Denny Purcell – mastering
 Jonathan Russell – mastering assistant
 David Scheinmann – photography

Charts

Weekly charts

Year-end charts

Certifications

References

External links 
 Golden Heart at Mark Knopfler official website

1996 debut albums
Albums produced by Chuck Ainlay
Albums produced by Mark Knopfler
Mark Knopfler albums
Vertigo Records albums
Warner Records albums
Songs about Napoleon